Howard L. Bailey (born July 31, 1957) is a former Major League Baseball (MLB) pitcher who played for three seasons. He was signed by the Detroit Tigers as an amateur free agent in 1978 after playing his college ball at Grand Valley State University. He played for the Tigers from 1981 to 1983, playing in 50 career games.  One highlight of Bailey's career occurred on October 1, 1982. In the second game of a doubleheader, Bailey picked up his one and only MLB save. He pitched three shutout innings to hold down a 4-2 Tigers victory over the Indians, saving the game for starting pitcher Pat Underwood.

References

External links

1957 births
Living people
Detroit Tigers players
Major League Baseball pitchers
Baseball players from Michigan
Grand Valley State Lakers baseball players
Lakeland Tigers players
Montgomery Rebels players
Evansville Triplets players
Birmingham Barons players
People from Grand Haven, Michigan